Palo Alto University (PAU) is a private university in Palo Alto, California that focuses on psychology and counseling. It was founded in 1975 as the Pacific Graduate School of Psychology and became Palo Alto University in 2009.

Palo Alto University offers two undergraduate degree programs: a Bachelor of Science in Psychology and Social Action and a Bachelor of Science in Business Psychology; four graduate programs: a Ph.D. in Clinical Psychology, a Psy.D. in Clinical Psychology as part of a consortium with Stanford University; an M.A. in Counseling and an M.S. in Psychology. PAU subscribes to the practitioner-scientist training model, which emphasizes clinical practice along with scientific training.

PAU has an interconnected relationship with Stanford University and the Stanford University School of Medicine. PAU maintains its doctoral program in conjunction with Stanford University, often employs its students in Stanford research laboratories, and houses faculty members who teach at both institutions. The chair of the Stanford Department of Psychiatry holds a membership on the PAU board of trustees.

History
In 1975, the Pacific Graduate School of Psychology was founded. PGSP is not affiliated with the similarly named Pacifica Graduate Institute, located in Carpinteria, California.

In August 2009, PGSP officially reincorporated, changed its name to Palo Alto University, and moved to a new campus on Arastradero Road that was formerly occupied by the American Institutes for Research, which it had purchased the previous year.

Academics

Undergraduate and college transfer programs
The undergraduate programs at Palo Alto University are offered in partnership with Silicon Valley area community colleges like De Anza College, Foothill College, and the College of San Mateo. The bachelor's degree completion programs are created for community college students wishing to transfer to a Bachelor's program and for college graduates wishing to re-specialize in psychology or business psychology. PAU offers an education in psychology for the lowest tuition and fees of any private university in the Bay Area and a smooth transfer process for community college students or those who have completed their freshman and sophomore years of college.

Master's programs
Palo Alto University offers two master's degree programs: (1) M.A. in Counseling MFT/LPCC (Online/On-Campus), (2) M.S. in Psychology (Online).  The M.A. in Counseling MFT/LPCC is a terminal master's degree that prepares students to see clients as a licensed therapist or counselor. There are two areas of emphasis: The Marriage, Family, and Child emphasis fulfills all requirements for MFT licensure in the State of California. The Clinical Mental Health emphasis fulfills all requirements for Licensed Professional Clinical Counselor (LPCC) licensure in California and select U.S. states and countries. In January 2017, both emphases of Palo Alto University's M.A. in Counseling degree were awarded CACREP accreditation.

The M.S. in Psychology is designed to prepare students to pursue a Ph.D. in Clinical Psychology or careers in community college teaching, research, and related business and nonprofit fields and is taught through distance learning (with the one-week summer intensive).

Both master's programs have online and in-person options.

Ph.D. program
Palo Alto University's Ph.D. program has been accredited by the American Psychological Association (APA) since 1988. The Ph.D. program consists of several emphasis areas including: Child & Family, Diversity & Community Mental Health, Forensic Psychology, LGBTQ Psychology, Meditation & Psychology, Neuropsychology, and Trauma.  Students have access to specialized research groups and clinical training opportunities through the Gronowski Center, a community-based psychology training clinic and treatment center dedicated to providing high quality, evidence-based, clinical services to adults, older adults, adolescents, children, and families in the community.

PGSP-Stanford Psy.D. Consortium
The PGSP-Stanford Psy.D. Consortium program, in conjunction with the Department of Psychiatry and Behavioral Sciences in Stanford University's School of Medicine, was accredited by the American Psychological Association in 2006. According to U.S. News & World Report, the PGSP-Stanford Psy.D. Consortium ranks 87th in the nation for best health schools by category of clinical psychology.

Clinical training
Students from the PAU Ph.D Clinical Psychology and PAU-Stanford Psy.D. Consortium program receive initial clinical practical training at the Gronowski Center, a mental health clinic hosted and partially funded by Palo Alto University that provides low-fee services on a sliding scale to the Bay Area community.

Library
Omar Seddiqui Library is named for the Director and President of the National Archives and Public Library, of Afghanistan (prior to  the  Saur Revolution).

Notable faculty and alumni
Larry E. Beutler, Ph.D., ABPP (Systematic Treatment Selection, Past President, Division 12, APA)
Christine Blasey Ford, Ph.D., publicly brought forth accusations of sexual assault by Brett Kavanaugh, now associate justice to the Supreme Court of the United States

References

External links
Official website

Universities and colleges in Santa Clara County, California
Buildings and structures in Palo Alto, California
Educational institutions established in 1975
Schools accredited by the Western Association of Schools and Colleges
1975 establishments in California
Private universities and colleges in California